"Flashlight" is a song recorded by English singer Jessie J for the soundtrack to the film Pitch Perfect 2 (2015). The song was written by Sia, Christian Guzman, Jason Moore and Sam Smith. The song was originally obtained when one pre-ordered the Pitch Perfect 2 soundtrack in the United States, beginning on 23 April 2015; it later became available for download on its own. "Flashlight" was released in the United Kingdom on 11 May 2015 both on the soundtrack and as a stand-alone single. "Flashlight" was particularly successful in Australia, peaking at number two, and number seven in New Zealand.

Hailee Steinfeld performs a version of "Flashlight" titled the "Sweet Life Mix" in the film Pitch Perfect 2. Her version of the song is included on the special edition of the film's soundtrack as well as Japanese version of Steinfeld's debut EP, Haiz (2015).

Composition
According to the sheet music published at musicnotes.com, the song has a tempo of 74 beats per minute. Jessie J's version is in the key of F major. Hailee Steinfeld's version is in E-flat major.

Critical reception
"Flashlight" received generally mixed reviews. In a less favourable review, Steven J. Horowitz of Billboard gave the song two stars out of five, saying: "prone to  funny bone shout-singing on her more upbeat singles, Jessie J dials back her vocal force on the tepid "Flashlight", off the Pitch Perfect 2 soundtrack. The more subtle delivery would be welcome if the track weren't so paint-by-numbers, it plays like a pantomime of a Sia ballad, but without the emotive edge."

Music video
The music video (directed by Hannah Lux Davis) was released on 23 April 2015 on YouTube. In the video, Jessie J heads to Barden University (the campus of UCLA) where she performs the ballad while watching the students go about their days while walking around the campus, while scenes from Pitch Perfect 2 are shown.

Use in film
The song is first sung by Barden University freshman Emily (Hailee Steinfeld) for her audition into the Barden Bellas, who have been suspended from competition. Emily explains that she writes songs to compensate for her anxieties, in this case, leaving home. Emily sings the song again later during the "Riff Off" which, due to it being an original song, causes the Bellas to be disqualified.

Upon learning that Emily writes her own songs, Beca (Anna Kendrick) offers to work with her on it and record the song in a studio. At the climax of the film, the Bellas incorporate "Flashlight" into their World Championships setlist.

Chart performance
The song debuted on the Billboard Hot 100 chart on 28 May 2015, at number 68. The song debuted on the UK Singles Chart on 24 May 2015, at number 62, eventually reaching number 13. The song debuted on the ARIA Charts on 18 May 2015, at number 15 and reached number 2 as of 8 June 2015. It reached number one in Indonesia.

Charts

Weekly charts

Year-end charts

Certifications

Release history

References

2010s ballads
2015 singles
2015 songs
Songs written for films
Jessie J songs
Hailee Steinfeld songs
Republic Records singles
Pop ballads
Music videos directed by Hannah Lux Davis
Songs written by Sam Smith (singer)
Songs written by Sia (musician)
Songs containing the I–V-vi-IV progression